Kvitlenova is a mountain on the border of Skjåk Municipality in Innlandet county and Stryn Municipality in Vestland county, Norway. The mountain is surrounded by several other notable mountains including Langvasseggi to the north, Raudeggi to the northeast, Skridulaupen and Sandåtinden to the east, Mårådalsfjellet to the southeast, Leirvasshøi to the south, and Nuken to the west. The Tystigbreen glacier lies on the west side of this mountain.

See also
List of mountains of Norway

References

Stryn
Skjåk
Mountains of Vestland
Mountains of Innlandet